Sarah Osborn (February 22, 1714 – August 2, 1796) was an early American Protestant and Evangelical writer who experienced her own type of "religious awakening" during the birth of American Evangelicalism, and through her memoirs, served as a preacher.

Born  in London, she moved to New England as a child, where she would eventually go on to write a series of memoirs which were later preserved by Samuel Hopkins, entitled, Memoirs of the Life of Mrs. Sarah Osborn, Who Died in Newport, on the Second Day of August, 1796  Enclosed within her diary, are the musings of a troubled and complicated woman, who experienced a great deal of hardship, and in turn, wanted to show that her life had meaning through the "grace of God." First written in 1742 at the age of 29 as a way to deal with life's difficulties, she quickly became aware of her work's value, and later "emerged as the leader of a remarkable religious revival that brought as many as five hundred people-including large numbers of enslaved people-to her house each week."

Sarah Osborn died in Newport, Rhode Island on August 2, 1796 at the age of 83.

References

 Mary Beth Norton, "'My Resting Reaping Times': Sarah Osborn's Defense of Her 'Unfeminine' Activities," Signs 2, No. 2 (1976).
 Charles Chauncy, Seasonable Thoughts on the State of Religion in New-England (Boston: Rogers and Fowle, 1742).
 Charles E. Hambrick-Stowe, "'Spiritual Pilgrimage of Sarah Osborn (1714-1796)," Church History 61, no. 4 (December 1992).
 Catherine A. Brekus, Sarah Osborn's World: The Rise of Evangelical Christianity in Early America (New Haven & London: Yale University Press, 2013).
 John Locke, An Essay Concerning Human Understanding, 4 vols. (1690;rpt. London: Awnsham and John Churchill, 1706), vol. 1.
 Samuel Hopkins, Memoirs of the life of Mrs. Sarah Osborn: Who Died in Newport, on the Second Day of August, 1796, in the Eighty-Third Year of Her Age (Gale & Sabin International, 2012).

External links
 Familiar Letters at Google Books
 Memoirs of the life of Mrs. Sarah Osborn, who died at Newport, Rhodeisland, on the second day of August, 1796. In the eighty third year of her age. / By Samuel Hopkins, D.D. Pastor of the First Congregational Church in Newport (1799) Online edition in the University of Oxford Text Archive

1714 births
1796 deaths
Writers from London
18th-century American women writers
18th-century American non-fiction writers
British emigrants to the Thirteen Colonies
American memoirists
American women memoirists